Hiroe (written: , , , ,  or ) is a feminine Japanese given name. Notable people with the name include:

, Japanese badminton player
, Japanese model and actress
, Japanese women's basketball player
, Japanese politician
, Japanese sport wrestler
, Japanese shogi player 
, Japanese actress and voice actress
, Japanese writer
, Japanese badminton player

Hiroe is also a Japanese surname. Notable people with the surname include:
, Japanese manga artist
, Japanese botanist

See also
Mount Hiroe, a mountain in Queen Maud Land, Antarctica
Hiroe Point, a headland in Queen Maud Land, Antarctica

Japanese feminine given names
Japanese-language surnames